Clarke County is located in the northeastern part of the U.S. state of Georgia. As of the 2020 census, the population was 128,671. Its county seat is Athens, with which it is a consolidated city-county.

Clarke County is included in the Athens-Clarke County, GA Metropolitan Statistical Area, which is also included in the Atlanta-Athens-Clarke County-Sandy Springs, GA Combined Statistical Area.

History 

Clarke County was created in 1801 by an act of the Georgia General Assembly on December 5. It was named for Revolutionary War hero Elijah Clarke and included  that was formerly part of Jackson County. Colonel Clarke played a leading role the 1779 victory at the Battle of Kettle Creek in Wilkes County. The Elijah Clarke Chapter of the Daughters of the American Revolution erected a monument to him in Broad Street in Athens.

As the population of the county grew in the early 19th century, its agricultural and cotton industries prospered. The adjacent plantation harvests flowed through city mills. Manufacturing and textile production operations were the major industries in Clarke County, especially after the railroad reached Athens in 1841. Athens and Clarke County were second only to Savannah and Chatham County in the amount of capital invested in manufacturing in the 1840s.

Two skirmishes were fought in Clarke County in 1864, during the American Civil War, one near Barber's Creek and the other near Mitchell's Road. Athens was occupied by the Union Army on May 29 and a provost-marshal took charge. Formal military occupation of the ended by December 1864, though Union troops remained in the county until early 1866.

In 1801 the Clarke County Commission had selected Watkinsville (now in Oconee County) as the county seat. All county offices, including the courts and jail, moved to Athens when the seat was moved on November 24, 1871. County meetings took place in the old Athens town hall, until a new courthouse was constructed in 1876. The present courthouse was built in 1914.

On February 12, 1875, in response to complaints over the relocation of the county seat to Athens, the state legislature created Oconee County from the southwestern portion of Clarke County, making Watkinsville its seat. Clarke County thus lost one-third of its population and three-fifths of its land area.

The position of "commissioner of roads and revenue" was created by the legislature for what are today known as county commissioners. As an extension of the state, the county would conduct welfare and health programs, build and maintain roads, and hold courts of law.

On March 29, 1973, the Georgia legislature increased the number of county commissioners from 3 to 5, also adding a county administrator.

In 1990, the residents voted to unify the city and county governments creating Athens-Clarke County, the second (after Columbus-Muscogee County) unified city-county government in the State of Georgia.

Geography
The county is located in the Piedmont region of the state.

The vast majority of Clarke County is located in the Upper Oconee River sub-basin of the Altamaha River basin, with a very small portion of the county's eastern edge, north of Winterville, located in the Broad River sub-basin of the Savannah River basin.

It is the smallest county by area in Georgia.

Adjacent counties 
 Madison County, Georgia - northeast
 Oglethorpe County, Georgia - southeast
 Oconee County, Georgia - southwest
 Barrow County, Georgia - west
 Jackson County, Georgia - northwest

Transportation

Major highways 

  U.S. Route 29
  U.S. Route 78
  U.S. Route 78 Business
  U.S. Route 129
  U.S. Route 441
  State Route 8
  State Route 10
  State Route 10 Loop
  State Route 15
  State Route 15 Alternate
  State Route 72
  State Route 422 (unsigned designation for State Route 10 Loop)

Pedestrians and cycling

 Athens North Oconee River Greenway
 Firefly Trail

Demographics

2000 census
As of the census of 2000, there were 101,489 people, 39,706 households, and 19,694 families living in the county. The racial makeup of the county was 64.89% White, 27.25% Black or African American, 0.21% Native American, 3.13% Asian, 0.04% Pacific Islander, 3.08% from other races, and 1.41% from two or more races. 6.34% of the population were Hispanic or Latino of any race.

There were 39,706 households, out of which 22.50% had children under the age of 18 living with them, 32.60% were married couples living together, 13.30% had a female householder with no husband present, and 50.40% were non-families. 29.70% of all households were made up of individuals, and 5.80% had someone living alone who was 65 years of age or older. The average household size was 2.35 and the average family size was 2.95.

In the county, the population was spread out, with 17.80% under the age of 18, 31.30% from 18 to 24, 27.40% from 25 to 44, 15.40% from 45 to 64, and 8.10% who were 65 years of age or older. The median age was 25 years. For every 100 females, there were 95.30 males. For every 100 females age 18 and over, there were 93.20 males.

The per capita income in the county was $20,948 in 2008, and the median income for a family was $36,039. Males had a median income of $30,482 versus $23,069 for females. In 2008, 32.2% of the county's population were living below the poverty line. As a result, Clarke ranked #4 on City Data's list of "Top 101 cities with the highest percentage of residents living in poverty in 2007".

2010 census
As of the 2010 United States Census, there were 116,714 people, 45,414 households, and 22,044 families living in the county. The racial makeup of the county was 61.9% white, 26.6% black or African American, 4.2% Asian, 0.2% American Indian, 0.1% Pacific islander, 4.9% from other races, and 2.2% from two or more races. Those of Hispanic or Latino origin made up 10.4% of the population. In terms of ancestry, 10.9% were English, 9.9% were German, 9.0% were Irish, and 6.6% were American.

Of the 45,414 households, 24.2% had children under the age of 18 living with them, 31.3% were married couples living together, 13.4% had a female householder with no husband present, 51.5% were non-families, and 30.6% of all households were made up of individuals. The average household size was 2.37 and the average family size was 3.00. The median age was 25.9 years.

The median income for a household in the county was $34,253 and the median income for a family was $51,687. Males had a median income of $37,896 versus $30,574 for females. The per capita income for the county was $19,839. About 16.6% of families and 33.5% of the population were below the poverty line, including 35.2% of those under age 18 and 10.5% of those age 65 or over.

2020 census

As of the 2020 United States census, there were 128,671 people, 52,124 households, and 24,041 families residing in the county.

Education

Politics
Clarke County has long been a Democratic Party stronghold in presidential elections. This predates the recent trend of Democratic gains in counties dominated by large universities. It has only backed the Republican candidate in three presidential elections, the fiercely divided realigning election of 1968 and the 49-state landslides of 1972 and 1984.

Communities
 Athens (county seat)
 Bogart (mostly in Oconee County)
 Winterville

See also

 National Register of Historic Places listings in Clarke County, Georgia
List of counties in Georgia

References

External links
 
 Athens - Clarke County Guide 
 Athens Historic Newspapers Archive in the Digital Library of Georgia
 Documents from Clarke County at the Digital Library of Georgia
 Clarke County historical marker

 
1801 establishments in Georgia (U.S. state)
Georgia (U.S. state) counties
Athens – Clarke County metropolitan area
Populated places established in 1801